Ernest Jansan (26 August 1874 – 31 May 1945) was an Australian cricketer. He played three first-class matches for New South Wales between 1899/1900 and 1903/04.

See also
 List of New South Wales representative cricketers

References

External links
 

1874 births
1945 deaths
Australian cricketers
New South Wales cricketers